Horsefly Lake Provincial Park is a provincial park in British Columbia, Canada. It is 1.86 ha. in size and is located south of Prince George.

References

External links 

 
 

Geography of the Cariboo
Provincial parks of British Columbia
Year of establishment missing